DZGB-TV, Channel 5, was a television station in Naga City, Camarines Sur. It is owned and operated by PBN Broadcasting Network, Inc., with studios and transmitter located at Romero Bldg., 32 Peñafrancia Avenue, Naga City, Camarines Sur 4400.

See also
 97.5 OK
 PBN Bicol

Television stations in Naga, Camarines Sur
Television channels and stations established in 1986